Alba María Redondo Ferrer (born 27 August 1996) is a Spanish professional footballer who plays as a forward for Liga F club Levante UD and the Spain women's national team.

Career
Redondo progressed through the youth system at her hometown club Fundación Albacete. In 2014, 17-year-old Redondo scored twice as "El Funda" beat UD Granadilla Tenerife Sur 2–0 to secure promotion to the top-level Primera División. Despite  playing for a relatively small club she developed into a proficient goalscorer and soon came to the attention of Spain women's national football team scouts. She made her debut for the senior national team in November 2018 and was also called-up for the 2019 Algarve Cup. The 2018–19 Primera División season ended in disappointment for Redondo when her 15 league goals failed to stop Fundación Albacete from finishing bottom of the league and being relegated. She was also omitted from national team coach Jorge Vilda's 23-player final squad for the 2019 FIFA Women's World Cup.

In June 2019 Redondo transferred to Levante, signing a two-year contract with a further one-year option. In November 2019 she scored twice against EdF Logroño but was knocked unconscious near the end of the match. Amidst farcical scenes, the physiotherapist who ran on to treat her was then sent off by the dogmatic referee, for not asking permission to enter the pitch. The following month Redondo endeared herself to the Levante supporters when she struck the only goal in a win over local rivals Valencia.

International career

International goals

References

External links
 
 

1996 births
Living people
Spanish women's footballers
Footballers from Castilla–La Mancha
Spain women's international footballers
Primera División (women) players
Women's association football midfielders
Fundación Albacete players
Levante UD Femenino players
Sportspeople from Albacete
Spain women's youth international footballers
21st-century Spanish women